Bunan, also known as Gahri, Ghara, Lahuli of Bunan, Boonan, Punan, Poonan, Erankad, Keylong Boli or Bunan, is a Sino-Tibetan language spoken in the Indian state of Himachal Pradesh.

Geographic distribution
It is spoken in villages such as Biling, Kardang, Kyelang, Guskyar, Yurnad, Gumrang, Barbog, Paspara, Pyukar and Styering.

See also
Bunan word list (Wiktionary)

Further reading
Sharma, Suhnu Ram. 1991. Body Parts Questionnaire (Bunan). (unpublished ms. contributed to STEDT).
Widmer, Manuel. 2014. A descriptive grammar of Bunan. Doctoral dissertation, Universität Bern.

References

Languages of Himachal Pradesh
West Himalayish languages
Endangered languages of India